"Very Merry Xmas" is the 39th Japanese single by South Korean pop duo Tohoshinki. Described as an upbeat Christmas carol, "Very Merry Xmas" was released on November 27, 2013 by Avex Trax as the third single from their seventh Japanese studio album, Tree. It was released in three versions – a CD+DVD version, a CD only version, and a Bigeast Board edition.

The song debuted at number two on the Oricon Singles Chart and peaked at number three on Billboard's Japan Hot 100. Selling over 116,000 copies in a week, "Very Merry Xmas" was certified gold by the Recording Industry Association of Japan (RIAJ) for shipments of over 100,000. As of December 2013, "Very Merry Xmas" has reported sales of 130,849 according to the Oricon.

"Very Merry Xmas" is written by Chris Buseck, Tom Hugo Hemansen, and is produced by Shinjiroh Inoue, a frequent collaborator of Tohoshinki. Inoue also wrote the lyrics to both songs, and wrote the B-side song "White".

Formats and track listings
Digital download
"Very Merry Xmas" – 4:06
"White" – 4:56
"Very Merry Xmas" (music video) – 4:24

CD+DVD single AVCK-79167/B
Disc 1 (CD)
"Very Merry Xmas" – 4:08
"White" – 4:58
"Very Merry Xmas" (Less Vocal) – 4:08
"White" (Less Vocal) – 4:58
Disc 2 (DVD)
"Very Merry Xmas" (Video Clip)
"Very Merry Xmas" (Off Shot Movie) (First Press Limited Edition only)

CD single AVCK-79168
"Very Merry Xmas" – 4:08
"White" – 4:58
"Very Merry Xmas" (Markus Bogelund's Audio Ninja Remix) 
"Very Merry Xmas" (Less Vocal) – 4:08
"White" (Less Vocal) – 4:58

Bigeast Board edition single
Disc 1 (CD)
"Very Merry Xmas" – 4:08
"White" – 4:58
"Very Merry Xmas" (Less Vocal) – 4:08
"White" (Less Vocal) – 4:58
Disc 2 (DVD)
"Very Merry Xmas" (Video Clip)

Charts

Oricon charts

Billboard Japan charts

Certifications

Release history

References

TVXQ songs
2013 singles
Japanese-language songs
Japanese Christmas songs